Section 122 of the Constitution of Australia deals with matters relating to the governance of Australian territories. It gives the Commonwealth Parliament complete legislative power over the territories. This power is called the territories power. The extent and terms of the representation of the territories in the House of Representatives and the Senate are also stated as being at the discretion of the Commonwealth Parliament.

The precise text of the section is:

The Parliament may make laws for the government of any territory surrendered by any State to and accepted by the Commonwealth, or of any territory placed by the Queen under the authority of and accepted by the Commonwealth, or otherwise acquired by the Commonwealth, and may allow the representation of such territory in either House of the Parliament to the extent and on the terms which it thinks fit.

Relationship with other provisions 
A court created for a Territory under the territories power is not a "court created by Parliament" for the purposes of Chapter III of the Constitution, even if the law constituting the court was passed by the Federal Parliament. This means that the protections of judicial tenure or the mandatory retirement found in section 72 do not apply to judges of Territory courts. Territory criminal offences do not have to be heard before a jury as section 80 requires of an indictable Commonwealth offence.

The "just terms" compensation requirement that applies when the Commonwealth compulsorily acquires property under section 51(xxxi) also does not apply in the territories. That said, the Self-Government Acts of the Australian Capital Territory and the Northern Territory include similar "just terms" clauses restricting the powers of those Territories' parliaments.

Reference list

Australian constitutional law